Matteo Arnaldi (born 22 February 2001) is an Italian tennis player.

Arnaldi has a career high ATP singles ranking of world No. 109 achieved on 13 February 2023 and a career high doubles ranking of world No. 286, achieved on 8 August 2022.

Career

Arnaldi made his ATP main draw debut at the 2022 Italian Open after receiving a wildcard into the singles and doubles main draws. He received these wildcards by winning the pre-qualification wildcard tournaments in both singles and doubles.

Following Holger Rune's withdrawal to be first alternate at the 2022 ATP Finals, Arnaldi gained entry to participate in the 2022 Next Generation ATP Finals.

ATP titles

Singles

References

External links

2001 births
Living people
Italian male tennis players
People from Sanremo
Sportspeople from the Province of Imperia
Mediterranean Games gold medalists for Italy
Competitors at the 2022 Mediterranean Games
Mediterranean Games medalists in tennis
21st-century Italian people